Rodrigo Modesto da Silva Moledo (born 27 October 1987) is a Brazilian footballer who plays at Internacional as a centre back.

Club career

Early career
Born in Rio de Janeiro, Moledo was known as Rodrigão during the start of his career. He started his senior career with Camboriú FC in early 2008, playing in the second division of Campeonato Catarinense.

Moledo attracted the interest of União Esporte Clube, a Brazilian football team from Rondonópolis, Mato Grosso. In the summer of 2009, they sent him on a loan in the Polish club Odra Wodzisław, and he returned to the side for the 2010 season, helping them to win the 2010 Campeonato Mato-Grossense.

Internacional
Moledo impressed the scouts of Internacional while playing for União in a match against them for the 2009 Copa do Brasil. He signed with the club in 2010, and spent his first year at the club with the B-side before being promoted to the main squad for the 2011 season. He scored his first goal for Inter on 7 September 2011, in 4–2 victory against América Mineiro in the Campeonato Brasileiro.

Metalist Kharkiv
In 2013, Metalist Kharkiv acquired Moledo for R$ 20.51 million. In Ukraine, the beginning was exciting and Moledo he started playing important matches, but a serious knee injury kept him out of for a number of games. In 2013–14 season, Moledo started in the Champions League qualifying round against PAOK. He had a vital role for the club in all competitions.

Return to Internacional
After leaving Metalist, Moledo returned to Internacional on 3 July 2015, signing a contract until the end of the year. However, he only featured twice as an unused substitute before leaving the club the following January, without making a re-debut.

Panathinaikos
In January 2016, Moledo signed for Panathinaikos until the summer of 2018. On 19 March 2016, he scored twice against Iraklis for Super League game and expressed his happiness for his team's victory. On 28 July 2016, he scored the only goal in a UEFA Europa League game against AIK for the first leg of the third qualifying round.

Moledo started the 2016–17 season as the indisputable leader of the Greens' defence. On 14 February 2017, Panathinaikos defender is believed to be unhappy for not having his contract renewed as ex-Panathinaikos manager Andrea Stramaccioni promised him.

Third spell at Internacional
On 10 January 2018, Moledo signed a contract with Sport Club Internacional, a deal which will begin on July 1 after his current agreement with Panathinaikos runs out. Fifteen days later, however, he moved immediately to the Colorado as Panathinaikos had a debt with the player; they accepted an offer of €150,000 for the transfer of the player.

International career
On 19 April 2013, Moledo was called up for Brazilian Team by coach Scolari for Brazil's April 24 friendly against Chile as a replacement for Henrique, who was playing a match for his club the next day.

However, CONMEBOL moved Palmeiras game to the next week, allowing Scolari to recall Henrique while keeping Moledo in the squad.

Honours
Internacional
Recopa Sudamericana: 2011
Campeonato Gaúcho: 2012, 2013

Individual
Super League GreeceTeam of the Year: 2015–16, 2016–17

References

External links
 

1987 births
Living people
Brazilian footballers
Brazilian expatriate footballers
Odra Wodzisław Śląski players
Sport Club Internacional players
FC Metalist Kharkiv players
Panathinaikos F.C. players
Expatriate footballers in Poland
Expatriate footballers in Ukraine
Expatriate footballers in Greece
Campeonato Brasileiro Série A players
Ukrainian Premier League players
Super League Greece players
Footballers from Rio de Janeiro (city)
Brazilian expatriate sportspeople in Poland
Brazilian expatriate sportspeople in Ukraine
Brazilian expatriate sportspeople in Greece
Association football central defenders
União Esporte Clube players